Jakub Voráček (born 15 August 1989) is a Czech professional ice hockey right winger for the Arizona Coyotes of the National Hockey League (NHL). Voráček was drafted seventh overall by the Blue Jackets at the 2007 NHL Entry Draft. In 2011, Voráček was traded to the Philadelphia Flyers in exchange for Jeff Carter. He played for the Flyers until 2021 when he was traded back to Columbus in exchange for Cam Atkinson. He has also played in his native Czech Republic for HC Lev Praha and Kladno.

Playing career

Junior
Voráček was taken first overall in the 2006 Canadian Hockey League (CHL) Import Draft and played two seasons with the Halifax Mooseheads of the Quebec Major Junior Hockey League (QMJHL). He also represented the Czech Republic at the World Junior Ice Hockey Championship in 2007 and 2008. On 2 August 2007, he signed a three-year, entry-level contract with the Columbus Blue Jackets, the NHL organization that drafted him seventh overall in the 2007 NHL Entry Draft.

Professional

Columbus Blue Jackets
Voráček made his NHL debut on 10 October 2008 against the Dallas Stars, also scoring his first career NHL goal in the game's first period on goaltender Marty Turco. Voráček scored 9 goals and 29 assists for 38 points in 80 games during his rookie season, helping the Blue Jackets make the Stanley Cup playoffs for the first time in franchise history in 2009. He also had the lone assist on the first-ever playoff goal in Blue Jackets history, scored by R. J. Umberger.

Philadelphia Flyers
On 23 June 2011, Voráček was traded (along with first- and third-round picks in the 2011 NHL Entry Draft) to the Philadelphia Flyers in exchange for Jeff Carter. Days later, on 1 July, Voráček signed a one-year contract with the Flyers, the same day his new team signed fellow Kladno native and long-time NHL star Jaromír Jágr to a one-year contract. In his Flyers debut against the Boston Bruins, Voráček scored a goal in the game's first period against goaltender Tim Thomas. In the 2011–12 season, Voráček set a new career-high with 18 goals scored, also later scoring his first career Stanley Cup playoff goal in Game 1 of the Flyers' opening round Eastern Conference Quarterfinal series against the Pittsburgh Penguins, beating Marc-André Fleury 2:23 into the first overtime period.

In the subsequent off-season, on 26 July 2012, Voráček signed a four-year, $17 million contract with the Flyers paying $4.25 million annually. Upon signing, Voráček was expected to fill the gap left by Jágr, who had departed weeks prior via free agency to Dallas, on the Flyers' top line, alongside Claude Giroux and Scott Hartnell.

Voráček returned to the Czech Republic to play for HC Lev Praha of the Kontinental Hockey League (KHL) during the 2012–13 NHL lockout. On 20 February 2013, shortly after play resumed in the NHL for the 2012–13 season, in a game against Pittsburgh, he scored his first career NHL hat-trick. On 25 February, he was then named the NHL's First Star of the Week after scoring four goals and seven assists in four games.

During the 2014–15 season, Voráček scored the second-fastest overtime goal in Flyers history on 22 December 2014 in a game against the Winnipeg Jets. The goal, unassisted, was scored just ten seconds into overtime against Jets goaltender Ondřej Pavelec at the MTS Center in Winnipeg. It was scored just three seconds slower than former Flyer Simon Gagné's overtime-winning goal seven seconds into the 5 January 2006 game against the New York Rangers. Later in the season, Voráček was named to the 2015 NHL All-Star Game in Columbus, Ohio. In the game, he tied the single NHL All-Star Game record for most points scored with six, tying Mario Lemieux's record previously set in the 1988 edition. Playing in all 82 regular season Philadelphia games, Voráček finished the year with 22 goals and 59 assists for a career-high 81 points, tying him for fourth in the NHL lead alongside the Washington Capitals' Alexander Ovechkin.

In July 2015, Voráček signed a new eight-year, $66 million contract with the Flyers. During the 2015–16 season, Voráček experienced a slump in number production while also recording his 400th NHL point and playing in his 600th career NHL game. During the season, Voráček only recorded 11 goals, the lowest in his NHL career since his rookie year. He played in his 600th NHL game against the Florida Panthers on 4 April 2016. Voráček concluded the regular season with 55 points overall. The Flyers qualified for the 2016 playoffs where they lost to the Washington Capitals in six games. Voráček recorded one goal over the six games.

At the beginning of the 2017–18 season, Voráček was on the Flyers' top line alongside Claude Giroux and Sean Couturier. Despite occasionally being moved to a different line, he ended the regular season with a career-high 85 points in 82 games. During his career year, Voráček became only the second Flyers player in franchise history (the first being Joni Pitkänen) to score the tying goal in a game with less than two minutes left and score in overtime. Voráček was also one of five Flyers players to end the regular season with 20 or more goals to help push the Flyers to the 2018 playoffs.

Return to Columbus
On 24 July 2021, Voráček was traded by the Flyers back to the Columbus Blue Jackets in exchange for Cam Atkinson.

On 6 January 2022, Voráček played his 1,000th NHL game against the New Jersey Devils.

Arizona Coyotes
On 2 March 2023, the Blue Jackets traded Voráček and a sixth-round pick in the 2023 NHL Entry Draft to the Arizona Coyotes in exchange for Jon Gillies.

Personal life
As a child, Voráček wanted to be a garbage man. In 2017, his sister gave him a Christmas gift of the opportunity to ride a trash truck while the garbage men worked their route. Voráček has two children: son Jakub Jr. born in 2016 to former girlfriend Nicole Warnecke and son Matěj born in 2019 with current girlfriend Markéta Burešová. He is a big fan of Bruce Springsteen.

Records
 Shares record with Mario Lemieux for most points in an NHL All-Star Game – 6

Career statistics

Regular season and playoffs

International

Awards and honours

References

External links

 

1989 births
Living people
Columbus Blue Jackets draft picks
Columbus Blue Jackets players
Czech expatriate ice hockey players in Canada
Czech expatriate ice hockey players in the United States
Czech ice hockey right wingers
Halifax Mooseheads players
HC Lev Praha players
Ice hockey players at the 2014 Winter Olympics
National Hockey League All-Stars
National Hockey League first-round draft picks
Olympic ice hockey players of the Czech Republic
Philadelphia Flyers players
Rytíři Kladno players
Sportspeople from Kladno